"5500 Degrees" is a song by American rapper EST Gee from his fifth mixtape Bigger Than Life or Death (2021). The song features American rappers Lil Baby, 42 Dugg and Rylo Rodriguez. It was produced by Enrgy Beats.

Composition
The song sees the rappers "deliver boastful bars" over a sample of "400 Degreez" by rapper Juvenile. In particular, Lil Baby proclaims himself as the Lil Wayne of the current hip hop generation.

Critical reception
The song received generally favorable reviews; Lil Baby's verse was particularly well-received by critics. Writing for Uproxx, Caitlin White commented, "All the rappers deliver on their verses, but Lil Baby's final, rapid-fire effort is definitely worth sticking around for." Mitch Findlay of HotNewHipHop wrote, "Though Lil Baby certainly has the edge in that department being a superstar and all, that doesn't stop the other three from bringing their A-game."

Music video
The official music video was directed by Diesel Films and released on August 11, 2021. It shows the four artists in a white room filled with luxury cars and motorbikes, showing their stacks of money and in the company of their crews.

Charts

Certifications

References

2021 songs
EST Gee songs
Lil Baby songs
42 Dugg songs
Songs written by Lil Baby
Songs written by EST Gee
Songs written by 42 Dugg